Deviot may refer to:

 Deviot, Tasmania, a village in the West Tamar Council
 Deviot Sailing Club, Tasmania
 A character in  Power Rangers